The University of Uppsala Botanical Garden (in Swedish Botaniska trädgården), near Uppsala Castle, is the principal botanical garden belonging to Uppsala University. It was created on land donated to the university in 1787 by Sweden's King Gustav III, who also laid the cornerstone of Linneanum, its orangery.

Uppsala University also maintains two satellite botanical gardens. The older of these is its original botanical garden, created in 1655 by Olaus Rudbeck, now called the Linnaean Garden (in Swedish Linnéträdgården). The other satellite is Linnaeus Hammarby (Linnés Hammarby), the former summer home of  Carl Linnaeus and his family.

The first botanical garden in Uppsala

Early botanical gardens focused on educating and supplying physicians, as had the medicinal gardens of medieval monasteries. Medical training remained the primary purpose of university botanical gardens throughout the seventeenth and eighteenth centuries.

In 1655, Uppsala University's Olaus Rudbeck the elder created the university's first botanical garden on Svartbäcksgatan in Uppsala. By the end of the 17th century, the garden contained about 1,800 different species. Unfortunately, the Uppsala city fire in 1702 seriously damaged Rudbeck's garden. Because there was no money for needed repairs, the garden languished for nearly 40 years until, in 1741, Rudbeck's student Carolus Linnaeus took over. Linnaeus improved and rearranged it according to his own ideas, documenting his work in Hortus Upsaliensis (1748).

Although the main botanical garden of the University of Uppsala has been moved to the Botaniska trädgården, the historic Linnéträdgården remains under the care of the university, which maintains it as Linnaeus had organized it in 1745.

Gift of land from King Gustav III

After the death of Linnaeus in 1778, his disciple and successor Carl Peter Thunberg became dissatisfied with the Linnaean Garden. Its location, near the river Fyris, kept the soil  too wet for many species of plants. Thunberg approached King Gustav III, whose castle in Uppsala stood upon much higher ground, to request the use of the castle's large formal garden for Uppsala University's botanical plantings.

Uppsala castle's large formal garden had been laid out in Baroque style in 1744, based on a plan by Carl Hårleman.  The king agreed to give not only this land but also an additional area south of Norbyvägen, and to pay for the university's costs in transforming it to its new mission.

King Gustav III signed the official grant on August 17, 1787. That day also, in a ceremony marked by the firing of 128 cannons, the king himself laid a foundation stone for the conservatory (Swedish Orangeriet), which had inside it a full set of Swedish coins as well as medals showing the King, Crown Prince, and Linnaeus.

After the death of Gustav III in 1792, work on the garden and its conservatory became difficult due to lack of money for the garden. The conservatory was finally officially opened on May 25, 1807, honoring the centennial of the birth of Linnaeus.

The making of the modern Botaniska Trädgården

By the beginning of the nineteenth century, botanical gardens had expanded from their medicinal origins. They were increasingly seen as research centers and as museums showing the diversity of life. Linnaeus had displayed many animals from his own menagerie in the Linnéträdgården, including a tame raccoon and six monkeys who lived in small huts set on poles.  In 1802, King Gustav IV Adolf gave to the Botaniska Trädgården many biological curiosities collected by his grandmother Lovisa Ulrika, who had been an important patron of Linnaeus.

A living lion named Leo also arrived from the king in 1802. It was housed in the Orangeriet, but did not thrive, not even when offered (according to the best scientific advice of the day) live chickens. It died from unknown causes in 1803. The University of Uppsala continued to display its zoological collections in the Orangeriet until 1856, when it moved them to its Gustavianum.

As the nineteenth century progressed, botanical gardens were increasingly seen as potential public spaces whose openness would offer civic benefits. Although Botaniska Trädgården remains a center for university teaching and research, its goals have expanded to include public education and recreation. In return, at least since 1897 it has received substantial support from governmental sources. In 1935, the garden and orangery building were designated national monuments.

As of 2011, the University of Uppsala opens to public visits all three of its botanical gardens, including the Botaniska Trädgården, whose extensive grounds, orangery (now housing a museum called the Linnaeanum), tropical greenhouses (built in the 1930s), and baroque garden (restored in the 1970s to the original design by Hårleman) attract more than 100,000 visitors every year.

References

External links
 Uppsala University's official site for its three botanical gardens
 Official listing at BCGI (Botanic Gardens Conservation International)

Botanical gardens of Uppsala University